Fuseini Salifu is a Ghanaian former professional footballer. During his playing career he played as a goalkeeper for Kumasi Asante Kotoko and Kumasi Cornerstones. At the international level, he is known for his involvement in the squad that won the 1978 African Cup of Nations.

International career 
He was key member, serving as back up goalkeeper to Joseph Carr for the squad that played in both the and 1978, 1980 African Cup of Nations helping Ghana to make history as the first country to win the competition three times and for keeps during the 1978 edition, after scoring Uganda 2–0 in the finals.

References

External links 

Living people
Association football goalkeepers
Asante Kotoko S.C. players
Ghana Premier League players
Ghana international footballers
Cornerstones F.C. players
Ghanaian footballers
Year of birth missing (living people)
Africa Cup of Nations-winning players
1978 African Cup of Nations players
1980 African Cup of Nations players